General Fletcher may refer to:

Antonio Fletcher (fl. 1980s–2020s), U.S. Army lieutenant general
Isaac Fletcher (1784–1842), Adjutant General of the Vermont Militia
Paul J. Fletcher (fl. 1970s–2000s), U.S. Air Force major general
Robert Fletcher (East India Company officer) (c. 1738–1776), Madras Army brigadier general